Monika Mrozowska (born 14 May 1980 in Warsaw, Poland) is a Polish actress and child singer.

As a little girl she sang in the well-known Polish children's music band Fasolki. In 1999 she started her regular acting career. She has an interest in arts - especially in sculpture - and she even runs her own small company.
She has two daughters: Karolina (born in 2003), Jagoda (born in 2010) and two sons: Jozef (born in 2014) and Lucjan (born in 2021).

Monika Mrozowska appeared twice in Playboy session (2004 and 2008).

Filmography 
 2010 - Hotel52 (tv-series)
 2000 - Sandra K. (tv-theatre)
 2000 - Portret podwójny
 1999 - W Nieparyżu i gdzie indziej (tv-theatre)
 1999-2009 - Rodzina zastępcza (tv-series) - Majka Kwiatkowska
 1999 - Blues (tv-theatre)
 1990 - Kapitan Conrad

External links 

IBFP entry
Filmweb entry
Pictures

1980 births
Living people
Polish actresses
Polish child actresses
21st-century Polish singers